Camptopus is a genus of true bugs belonging to the family Alydidae, subfamily Alydinae.

Species
Species within this genus include:
 Camptopus bifasciatuS Fieber, 1864
 Camptopus eberti Seidenstücker, 1968
 Camptopus illustris Horváth 1899
 Camptopus lateralis (Germar, 1817) 
 Camptopus tragacanthae (Kolenati, 1845)

References 

Alydinae
Pentatomomorpha genera